Farghamiru is a village in Badakhshan Province in north-eastern Afghanistan., south of Jurm on the Kokcha River.=

References

Populated places in Jurm District